From a Whisper is a Kenyan drama film written and directed by African Movie Academy Award winner Wanuri Kahiu. The film received 12 nominations and won 5 awards at the Africa Movie Academy Awards in 2009, including Best Picture, Best Original Soundtrack, Best Director, Best Original Screenplay and AMAA Achievement in Editing. The film also won the Best Feature Narrative award at the 2010 Pan African Film & Arts Festival, and was honored with the 2010 BAFTA/LA Festival Choice Prize. Although the film commemorates the 10th anniversary of the 7 August terrorist bombing in Kenya in 1998, it is not about the terrorist bombing. The movie portrays a realistic story of the aftermath of the bombing, by capturing the lives of the victims and their families who had to pick up the pieces of their lives shredded by the blast.

Synopsis 
From a Whisper is based on the real events surrounding the 7 August bomb attacks on the US Embassy in Nairobi in 1998. Abu is an intelligence officer who keeps to himself. When he meets Tamani, a young, rebellious artist in search of her mother, he decides to help. The discovery of her death churns up memories of Fareed, Abu's best friend who also lost his life in the attack. The discovery forces them to learn how to forgive, to believe in themselves, and confront what they fear the most – the truth.

Cast 
Ken Ambani
Abubakar Mwenda
Godfrey Odhiambo
Corine Onyango

Awards 
 Festival Internacional de Zanzíbar 2009
 Festival Internacional de Kenya 2009
 Africa Movie Academy Awards 2010

References

External links
 

Best Film Africa Movie Academy Award winners
2008 drama films
2008 films
Best Soundtrack Africa Movie Academy Award winners
Best Screenplay Africa Movie Academy Award winners
Best Editing Africa Movie Academy Award winners
Kenyan drama films
English-language Kenyan films
2000s English-language films
2008 directorial debut films